Kim Yun-ho (born 21 September 1990) is a South Korean footballer who plays as defender for Busan IPark.

Career
He was selected by Gangwon FC in 2013 K League draft.

Club career statistics
As of 4 December 2016

References

External links 

1990 births
Living people
Association football defenders
South Korean footballers
Gangwon FC players
Busan IPark players
K League 1 players
K League 2 players